The Ipoh North–Ipoh South Local Express Lane, or Jalan Jelapang–Ampang (based on Waze social GPS-map applications), Federal Route 239 (northbound) and 240 (southbounds), are toll-free local-express lanes in the North–South Expressway Northern Route E1 in Ipoh, Perak, Malaysia.

There are five interchange along the local express lane, Jelapang, Meru Raya, Ipoh North, Ipoh South and Tambun.

History
The Jelapang and Ipoh South toll plazas were demolished in 2009 to make a non-stop route across Ipoh. This is achieved through the construction of two local-express lanes for each side, which are only accessible via Exit 138 Ipoh South Exit (for northbound traffic) and Exit 141 Ipoh North Exit (for southbound traffic). The toll plazas in Ipoh were relocated to each end of the local-express lanes.

The decision to demolish both toll plazas was made as a result of accidents which happened at Jelapang toll plaza. Since the toll plaza was opened on 28 September 1987, there were many accident cases which involved brake failure in heavy vehicles due to hard braking when proceeding downhill to the toll plaza. On 7 June 2008, the new Ipoh North toll plaza (South bound) replacing old Jelapang toll plaza opened to traffic, followed by northbound on 15 August 2008. Since 14 July 2009, the Johor Bahru-Kuala Lumpur–Penang through traffic has been open to traffic.

In 2014, the Ipoh North–Ipoh South Local Express Lane were gazetted as Federal Route 239 for northbound and Federal Route 240 for southbound.

Features
At most sections, the Federal Route 239 and 240 was built under the JKR R5 road standard, allowing maximum speed limit of up to 90 km/h.

List of interchanges

Jalan Ampang–Jelapang

Jalan Jelapang–Ampang

References

Highways in Malaysia
Malaysian Federal Roads